This is a list of monuments in Lalitpur District, Nepal as officially recognized by and available through the website of the Department of Archaeology, Nepal.

Patan Durbar Square also known as Lalitpur Durbar Square, in the city of Lalitpur, is an ancient palace in Kathmandu Valley. There are numerous monuments in the square. The palace square is listed as world heritage sites by the UNESCO.

List of monuments

|}

See also 
 List of monuments in Bagmati Province
 List of monuments in Nepal

References

External links

Lalitpur